Cammenga is an outdoors products company, known chiefly for producing navigation equipment under contract for United States Armed Forces. They are the official supplier of the M-1950 lensatic field compass issued to U.S. Army and Marine Corps infantry and artillery units.

Profile
Cammenga was founded in 1992 by a group of investors to produce the M-1950 3H lensatic compass to the U.S. Armed Forces.  Since 1992, Cammenga has held the U.S. military contract for the M-1950.  The firm develops, manufactures, and distributes a wide variety of products to military, law enforcement, and commercial markets around the world, including land navigation instruments, firearm sighting and loading systems, firearm magazines, tritium knives, and other tritium light source integration services.  The company provides development assistance in tritium (self-luminous) lighting products, NRC approval processing, tritium capsule assembly and installation procedures, and product testing.  The company is ISO 9001:2000 certified.

Manufacturing facility
Cammenga's primary production plant includes a clean room environment for the assembly and testing of tritium products and critical devices. The company provides Cammenga assists with tritium product design, NRC approval processing, tritium installation, and product testing.

U.S. M-1950 3H Lensatic Compass

The M-1950 U.S. military lensatic field compass with self-luminous lighting (designated the Model 3H by Cammenga) is fitted with self-luminous tritium vial lighting.  Under U.S. military specification (MIL-SPEC) performance criteria, ten pre-production samples of the M-1950 are required to meet a battery of performance, durability, and accuracy standards.  This includes an overall inherent accuracy standard of ±40 mils (2.25 degrees) from actual magnetic azimuth; a tritium illumination test; and a shock or impact test, in which samples of the M-1950 are tested dropping the compass from a height of 90 cm (35 in.) on a solid surface covered with 10 cm (4 in.) of plastic-covered sand, followed by testing to ensure performance within specified accuracy standards.  A water leakage test is also performed.

See also
 Compass
 Navigation
 Orienteering

References

External links
 Cammenga homepage
 Visit also the Online Compass Museum

Companies based in Michigan
Navigational equipment manufacturers